Laisa Laveti Tuifagalele (born 27 August 1967) is a Fijian judoka. She competed at the 1992 Summer Olympics and the 2000 Summer Olympics.

References

1967 births
Living people
Fijian female judoka
Olympic judoka of Fiji
Judoka at the 1992 Summer Olympics
Judoka at the 2000 Summer Olympics
Place of birth missing (living people)